Bagabag is an island in the Madang Province of Papua New Guinea having a dormant volcano.

Bagabag is 43 km east-north-east from Cape Croilles on the northern coast of the Papua New Guinea mainland, and is the closest island to Karkar Island which is 18 km to the north-west. The island is approximately circular in shape, with a diameter of about 7 km. It has an area of 37 km². The prominent feature of the coast is New Year Bay, that cuts into the south-eastern side of the island. Volcanic in origin, terrain on Bagabaga consists of steep, thickly vegetated slopes that rise to over 600 m above sea level. Much of the northern, eastern and southern coasts are fringed by a barrier-type reef some 2 km offshore; the reef is narrow, and mostly submerged.

People from Karkar visit Bagabag by canoe. The island is rich in betel-nut, local pigs and garden food. The island supports four villages with a total population of about 3,000.

The first recorded sighting by Europeans of Karkar Island was by the Spanish navigator Iñigo Órtiz de Retes on 10 August 1545 when on board of the carrack San Juan tried to return from Tidore to New Spain.

References

Islands of Papua New Guinea
Stratovolcanoes of Papua New Guinea
New Ireland Province
Pleistocene stratovolcanoes